Uno contro l'altro, praticamente amici (Against Each Other, Practically Friends) is a 1981 Italian comedy film directed by Bruno Corbucci.

Cast 

Renato Pozzetto as Franco Colombo
Tomas Milian as  Quinto Cecioni aka "Er Monnezza"
Anna Maria Rizzoli as Silvana Cecioni 
Bombolo as Capoccione
Caterina Boratto as  Miss Colombo, mother of Franco
Riccardo Billi as  Grandpa Domenico
Alfredo Rizzo as  Lawyer Randolfi 
 Alessandra Cardini as Miss Cecioni 
 Leo Gavero as Minister
Elisa Mainardi as  Madama di Tebe
Sergio Di Pinto as Paccotto
Andrea Aureli as Giacinto
Francesco Anniballi as  Sor Gigi
Tony Scarf as Charly Broonson
 Ennio Antonelli as Cicerchia

See also        
 List of Italian films of 1981

References

External links

1981 films
1981 comedy films
Films directed by Bruno Corbucci
Films set in Rome
Italian comedy films
Films scored by Guido & Maurizio De Angelis
Films shot in Rome
Films set in Lombardy
1980s Italian films